San Fernando ("Saint Ferdinand") is a town in the province of Cádiz, Spain. It is home to more than 97,500 inhabitants. The city also uses the name "La Isla" (The Island). The people from San Fernando are locally known as "Cañaíllas" or "Isleños".

History 
In history, the city played a paramount role when in 1810 during the French occupation led by Napoleon, San Fernando and Cádiz were the only parts of Spain which did not surrender to the French.

The deputies elected to the Cortes of Cádiz met in the Teatro Cómico, and started preparation of the first liberal constitution of Spain, which was approved in the neighbouring city of Cádiz in 1812.

Flamenco singer Camarón de la Isla was born in San Fernando.

It holds the Panteón de Marinos Ilustres.

Notable people from San Fernando
Julia Medina, singer
Quintin Dobarganes, Journalist
Magdalena Álvarez, Politician, former minister of Mr. Zapatero team
Sara Baras, Flamenco Dancer
Luis Berenguer, Writer
Manolo Casal, Canal Sur TV Presenter
Juan Ruiz Casaux, Cellist and Teacher
Beato Marcelo Espínola, Bishop, proposed to be a Saint
Hermana Cristina, Sister, Bishop, proposed to be a Saint
Camarón de la Isla, Flamenco singer
Chato de la Isla, Flamenco singer
Fermín Galán (1899–1930), Spanish soldier who led the failed Jaca uprising a few months before the foundation of the Second Spanish Republic.
Carmen Guaita, writer
Anne Hidalgo, incumbent Mayor of Paris
Francisco José Maldonado, footballer currently with Sporting de Gijón
Abraham Mateo, Singer and Actor
Tony Mateo, Singer and Actor
Fran Ocaña, Singer 
Alex O'Dogherty, Actor
Pepe Oneto, Journalist
Rafael Gómez Ortega, Bullfighter
Niña Pastori, Flamenco singer
Ana Rosetti, Writer
Francisco Ruiz Miguel, Bullfighter
Yordi, retired footballer
Servando Sánchez, footballer
David Barral Torres, footballer
Abraham Mateo, pop singer
Ramón Rodriguez Verdejo "Monchi", Director of Football of Sevilla F.C.SAD
José Enrique Varela (1891–1951), military officer

Sister cities
 Montigny-le-Bretonneux, 
 Badalona, 
 San Fernando Valley,

Demographics

See also
Iglesia Vaticana Castrense de San Francisco
Plaza de los hornos púnicos y fenicios
Puente Marqués de Ureña
San Fernando Naval Museum

References

External links

Cadiz Province – San Fernando
  Ayuntamiento de San Fernando
  San Fernando Travel Guide

 
Municipalities of the Province of Cádiz
Port cities and towns on the Spanish Atlantic coast
Costa de la Luz